The 1990–91 NBA season was the 45th season of the National Basketball Association. The season ended with the Chicago Bulls winning their first NBA Championship, eliminating the Los Angeles Lakers 4 games to 1 in the NBA Finals.

This season would prove to be Magic Johnson's last full season as a player, as he announced he was HIV positive and retired early the following season (Johnson would play part of the 1995-96 NBA season with the Lakers before permanently retiring).

Notable occurrences

The Trent Tucker Rule was adopted. When Trent Tucker hit a walk-off three-point field goal at the buzzer in the previous season, the clock had started with 0.1 left. It prevents any shot to be taken with up to 0.2 seconds left in the period; the lone exception was a tip-in.
The Los Angeles Lakers failed to win their division for the first time in ten years.
The Orlando Magic moved to the Midwest Division of the Western Conference, but like the Miami Heat two seasons ago, experienced long road trips back and forth out west. They would move to the Atlantic Division the next season.
The 1991 NBA All-Star Game was played at the Charlotte Coliseum in Charlotte, North Carolina, with the East defeating the West 116–114. Charles Barkley of the Philadelphia 76ers won the game's MVP award. In the Three-Point Shootout, Chicago Bulls guard Craig Hodges set a record by making 19 consecutive shots, en route to winning his second straight shootout title, and Boston Celtics guard Dee Brown won the Slam Dunk Contest. 
The Minnesota Timberwolves played their first season at the Target Center. They had played their first season at Hubert H. Humphrey Metrodome while Target Center was being built. 
The NBA on NBC began (replacing The NBA on CBS) when the National Broadcasting Company signed a 4-year, US$600 million deal with the NBA. The relationship lasted 12 years (concluding at the end of the 2001–02 NBA season), until The NBA on ABC returned in 2002–03.
On December 30, the last game of 1990, Scott Skiles of Orlando recorded 30 assists in a game against the Denver Nuggets to set a new NBA record.
The Utah Jazz played their final season at the Salt Palace.
The flagrant foul was instituted.
For the first time since 1981, the Los Angeles Lakers were not the Number 1 seed in the Western Conference. However they still reached the NBA Finals by upsetting the heavily favored Portland Trail Blazers in six games. They would go on to lose to the Chicago Bulls in five games, their last NBA Finals appearance until 2000.
During the season, all NBA teams sport patches featuring the American flag on their warmups as an honor to the American soldiers fighting during the Persian Gulf War. Champion became the league's official outfitter.
The Golden State Warriors became the only seventh seeded team to beat the second seed twice since the 16-team playoff field was introduced seven years earlier. The Warriors defeated the San Antonio Spurs in four games.
The NBA becomes the first major professional sports league to play outside North America, as the Phoenix Suns and Utah Jazz open the season against each other in Tokyo, Japan.
On March 9, 1991, the Houston Rockets' Akeem Olajuwon officially changed the spelling of his first name to Hakeem.

1990–91 NBA changes
 The Indiana Pacers changed their logo and uniforms, adding navy to their color scheme.
 The Minnesota Timberwolves moved into Target Center.
 The New Jersey Nets changed their logo and uniforms.
 The New York Knicks slightly changed their uniforms replacing their alternate "NY" logo on the left leg of their shorts with their current primary logo.
 The Sacramento Kings changed their uniforms, adding a darker blue color from their primary logo.

Standings

By division
Eastern Conference
 
 

Western Conference

By conference

Notes
z – Clinched home court advantage for the entire playoffs
c – Clinched home court advantage for the conference playoffs
y – Clinched division title 
x – Clinched playoff spot

Playoffs

Teams in bold advanced to the next round. The numbers to the left of each team indicate the team's seeding in its conference, and the numbers to the right indicate the number of games the team won in that round. The division champions are marked by an asterisk. Home court advantage does not necessarily belong to the higher-seeded team, but instead the team with the better regular season record; teams enjoying the home advantage are shown in italics.

Statistics leaders

NBA awards
Most Valuable Player: Michael Jordan, Chicago Bulls
Rookie of the Year: Derrick Coleman, New Jersey Nets
Defensive Player of the Year: Dennis Rodman, Detroit Pistons
Sixth Man of the Year: Detlef Schrempf, Indiana Pacers
Most Improved Player: Scott Skiles, Orlando Magic
Coach of the Year: Don Chaney, Houston Rockets

All-NBA First Team:
F – Karl Malone, Utah Jazz
F – Charles Barkley, Philadelphia 76ers
C – David Robinson, San Antonio Spurs
G – Michael Jordan, Chicago Bulls
G – Magic Johnson, Los Angeles Lakers

All-NBA Second Team:
F – Dominique Wilkins, Atlanta Hawks
F – Chris Mullin, Golden State Warriors
C – Patrick Ewing, New York Knicks
G – Kevin Johnson, Phoenix Suns
G – Clyde Drexler, Portland Trail Blazers

All-NBA Third Team:
F – James Worthy, Los Angeles Lakers
F – Bernard King, Washington Bullets
C – Hakeem Olajuwon, Houston Rockets
G – John Stockton, Utah Jazz
G – Joe Dumars, Detroit Pistons

NBA All-Rookie First Team:
Dee Brown, Boston Celtics
Kendall Gill, Charlotte Hornets
Derrick Coleman, New Jersey Nets
Dennis Scott, Orlando Magic
Lionel Simmons, Sacramento Kings

Second Team:
Chris Jackson, Denver Nuggets
Willie Burton, Miami Heat
Travis Mays, Sacramento Kings
Gary Payton, Seattle SuperSonics
Felton Spencer, Minnesota Timberwolves

NBA All-Defensive First Team:
Michael Jordan, Chicago Bulls
Alvin Robertson, Milwaukee Bucks
David Robinson, San Antonio Spurs
Dennis Rodman, Detroit Pistons
Buck Williams, Portland Trail Blazers

Second Team:
Joe Dumars, Detroit Pistons
John Stockton, Utah Jazz
Hakeem Olajuwon, Houston Rockets
Scottie Pippen, Chicago Bulls
Dan Majerle, Phoenix Suns

Player of the week
The following players were named NBA Player of the Week.

Player of the month
The following players were named NBA Player of the Month.

Rookie of the month
The following players were named NBA Rookie of the Month.

Coach of the month
The following coaches were named NBA Coach of the Month.

Notes

References